The 1994–95 Club Atlético Morelia season is the 71st campaign in existence and 13th consecutive season in the top flight division of Mexican football.

Summary 
In summertime chairman Nicandro Ortiz in his 12th as club President reinforced the squad with several players not a lot of transfers due to financial worries given the lack of support by State Government of Michoacan.  For this season the team was gathered in Group 1 amongst America, Necaxa, Incumbent Champions Tecos UAG and Tigres UANL evidently a difficult group with low chances to clinch postseason, hence, the expectatives were centered undoubtedly in avoiding the relegation against Toros Neza, Correcaminos UAT and Tampico Madero.

The squad clinched its objective thanks to a superb performance of Chilean striker Marco Antonio Figueroa scoring 19 goals with a decent performance of the offensive line despite the poor performance delivered by the defensive line. The foreign arrivals but Figueroa had an irregular campaign Chileans Vera and Luis H. Perez played in a mediocre season added to the low-level showed by Uruguayan Goalkeeper Burguez.

However, the team managed by Antonio Carbajal in his 10th season as head coach  finished in a low 15th spot overall, 4th in the group and 5 points behind CD Veracruz the last spot for Playoff with serious relegation problems for the next season.

Squad

Transfers

Winter

Competitions

La Liga

League table

Group 3

General table

Results by round

Matches

Statistics

Goalscorers 
19.  Marco Antonio Figueroa

References

External links 

1994–95 Mexican Primera División season
1994–95 in Mexican football
Atlético Morelia seasons